USS Breakwater (SP-681) was a United States Navy patrol vessel, minesweeper, and tug in commission from 1917 to 1920.

Breakwater was built as a wooden-hulled, single-screw commercial steam fishing trawler of the same name at Milton, Delaware, in 1907. In the spring of 1917, the U.S. Navy purchased her from the Lewes Fishing Company of Lewes, Delaware, for use during World War I. Assigned the section patrol number 681, she was commissioned at the Philadelphia Navy Yard in Philadelphia, Pennsylvania, on 12 May 1917 as USS Breakwater (SP-681).

Assigned to the 4th Naval District, Breakwater operated as a patrol vessel, minesweeper, and tug for the remainder of World War I and into the summer of 1919.

On 15 July 1919, Breakwater was assigned to Submarine Division 1 at Coco Solo in the Panama Canal Zone. Breakwater reached her station in the Canal Zone and operated out of Coco Solo as a utility vessel with Submarine Division 1.

Drydocked in the spring of 1920, Breakwater was found to be in poor shape, and a board of inspection and survey condemned her. She was decommissioned at Coco Solo on 8 September 1920 and was sold to the Panama Construction Company on 8 April 1921.

Notes

References

Department of the Navy Naval History and Heritage Command Online Library of Selected Images: U.S. Navy Ships: USS Breakwater (SP-681), 1917-1921
NavSource Online: Section Patrol Craft Photo Archive Breakwater (SP 681)

Patrol vessels of the United States Navy
World War I patrol vessels of the United States
Minesweepers of the United States Navy
World War I minesweepers of the United States
Auxiliary ships of the United States Navy
World War I auxiliary ships of the United States
Ships built in Milton, Delaware
1907 ships